Volt Europa (frequently abbreviated as Volt) is a pro-European and European federalist political party (often self-referring as a "movement"), which is organized as a pan-European umbrella for subsidiary parties of the same name and branding in all EU member states and several non-EU states (such as UK, Switzerland, and Ukraine). 

Volt sets out to align its members' political positions across Europe,  as such it presented a common, pan-European manifesto for eight member states to the European Parliament elections in May 2019. The organisation aims to find European, supranational solutions on issues such as climate change, defense, energy, migration, economic inequality, terrorism and the impact of the technological revolution on the labour market. As such, the party is strongly in favor of European integration, with the stated goal of creating a European state. Further, it endorses a European army, joint European debt and taxes, as well as stronger economic solidarity between the member states. 

While using the slogan "Neither left, nor right" in its early days, Volt can be considered as center to center-left in the general European context, with a strong focus on European unity and integration. In local and national elections, Volt ran on a platform of "evidence-based policy" and the sharing of best practice between EU member states and municipalities.

Volt was officially founded on 29 March 2017. In March 2018, the first national subsidiary party was founded in Hamburg, Germany. Volt has since established local teams in all EU member states, as well as in Albania, Switzerland, Ukraine, and the United Kingdom, and is registered as a legal party in most of these countries.

History

Foundation
Volt Europa was founded on 29 March 2017 by Andrea Venzon, Colombe Cahen-Salvador and Damian Boeselager, on the same day that the United Kingdom formally announced its intention to leave the European Union under Article 50 TEU. According to their own statement, Volt's foundation was a reaction to growing populism in the world as well as to Brexit. Venzon became founding President, Boeselager Vice President, and Cahen-Salvador policy lead.

First European Parliament election (2019)

From 27 to 28 October 2018 Volt Europa hosted its General Assembly meeting in Amsterdam, agreeing its Amsterdam Declaration, which also served as its manifesto programme for the European Parliament elections. The party previously gathered in Berlin, Bucharest, and Paris.

From 22 to 24 March 2019 Volt Europa hosted its first European Congress in Rome, presenting its candidates for the 2019 European Parliament election. The keynote speakers list included Paolo Gentiloni (former Prime Minister of Italy and President of the Italian Democratic Party), Emma Bonino (Italian senator and former European Commissioner for Health and Food Safety), Enrico Giovannini (former Italian Government minister), Marcella Panucci (Director General of the General Confederation of Italian Industry), Sandro Gozi (President of the Union of European Federalists) and Antonio Navarra (President of the Mediterranean Center for Climate Change).

During the European Parliament elections in May 2019 the party won one seat by winning 0.7 percent of votes in Germany, with Damian Boeselager its first Member of the European Parliament.

On 9 June 2019, following a pan-European vote of party members, Volt elected to join the Greens–European Free Alliance group in the European Parliament. In the future, Volt hopes to be able to form its own political group in the European Parliament, which would require a minimum of 25 MEPs from at least seven different member states.

Election of new board and first pan-European digital assembly (2019–2020)

From 12 to 13 October 2019, Volt Europa hosted its general assembly in Sofia to elect the new board of Volt Europa. While Volt up that point had been an ASBL non-profit with only few registered members, based in Luxembourg, it was transformed into an AISBL non-profit according to Belgian law. In the AISBL structure all members of the Volt movement, as well as the national subsidaries could become voting members. The statutes of Volt Europa lay out a general assembly, open to all members, which decides on important issues, and elects a gender-balanced board of 9 directors. 

The Sofia general assembly elected former Volt Deutschland president Valerie Sternberg and the former MEP lead candidate of Volt Nederland, Reinier van Lanschot, as co-presidents of Volt Europa with a two-year mandate until 2021. 

Due to the COVID-19 pandemic, Volt did not host its Spring 2020 general assembly in Lisbon as planned, but instead became the first pan-European political movement to publicly host a digital general assembly, including a decision on its programme until 2024.

Involvement in national politics

Volt contested the 2021 Dutch general election, with Laurens Dassen leading the party list. Volt Netherlands ultimately won 2.4% of votes, their best national performance in any election to date, and three seats, marking their first entrance into a national legislature.

Volt Bulgaria participated in all three Bulgarian parliamentary elections in 2021, the first two as part of the anti-government coalition ISMV then under PP for the third election. ISMV won seats in both elections but none of them were allocated to members of Volt. PP won the November 2021 election and thus Volt gained two seats, which it defended in the election in October 2022. Nastimir Ananiev served as the chairperson of the parliamentary committee of the Regional Committee, as well as deputy chair of the PP parliamentary group, while Ventsislava Lyubenova  served as chair of the foreign relations committee. 

From 16 to 17 October 2021, Volt Europa hosted its General Assembly in Lisbon, Portugal. It was the first physical General Assembly since 2019. During the 2021 General Assembly, Reinier van Lanschot who has been co-president since the General Assembly in Sofia 2019 was reelected. Francesca Romana D'Antuono from Italy was elected as co-president. Johannes Heinrich from Switzerland was elected as treasurer. The six non-executive board members elected were: Ines Consonni, Anouk Ooms, Lucia Nass, Thor Larholm, Charles Evain and Lucas Amorelli Ribeiro Kornexl.

In the 2022 Dutch municipal elections Volt won 20 seats, across 10 municipalities, while in the 2023 Dutch provincial elections it gained 11 seats across regional councils and 2 seats in the Senate. 

In Germany, Volt has gained mandates in many city councils of mostly major cities, including Cologne, Bonn, Darmstadt, Munich, Frankfurt, Wiesbaden, and Hannover.

Name 
Volt Europa was incorporated as a non-profit association (ASBL) in Luxembourg under the name Volt Europa, abandoning a previous name of Vox Europe to avoid any confusion with a similarly named far-right Spanish party. 
"Volt" was chosen as a name due to its similarity to the initial name and the added meaning of figuratively bringing voltage into politics. Added to that, both the term "Volt" and the Latin version of name of the European continent are understood in all European languages, hence as a transcontinental movement Volt Europa does not need to translate its own name, except for languages where non-Latin alphabets are used (like Bulgaria and Greece).

Political Standpoints 
In 2018, Volt identified "the 5+1 fundamental challenges", which it has identified as crucial for an improvement of the European Union:

 Smart state – Digitalisation of public services
 Economic renaissance – a blend of circular, green and blue economic models
 Social equality – Human rights, equality of opportunity, gender equality, and tolerance of cultural differences
 Global balance – Sustainable and responsible policies in farming and trade, measures to address climate change and refugee crises, and support for labour migration and development cooperation
 Citizen empowerment – Greater subsidiarity, social responsibility, and participatory democracy
 European reform – Federation of EU states, with greater responsibilities for its regions and cities

On economic issues, Volt Europa supports digitisation, investment in the green and blue economy, measures to address poverty and inequality (including a European minimum incomes of at least 40% of the median wage), a more integrated European tax system with exclusively European taxes, and the use of public-private partnerships; it also supports increased spending on welfare, in particular related to education and healthcare. On social policy, Volt opposes sexism and racism and supports LGBT+ rights. It also supports deep reforms to EU institutions, including common management of migration and border protection, a European army, and European debt and taxation. Volt argues that a European army should be established and that the relationship between the EU and NATO should be reviewed and balanced.

Volt supports the idea of a federal Europe with a strong European Parliament, in order to create a united European voice on the global stage. There should be a European government, elected and accountable to the parliament, instead of a European commission. The European election law should be uniform across all member states, the European parliament should gain the right to initiate laws, and the European Council should be transformed into a second chamber with regressive voting weights to balance the dominance of larger states. Volt supports a referendum across all member states, which legitimizes such a constitution for the set of agreeing member states to form a core union, even if not every member state agrees.

In terms of environmental policy, Volt has committed to the 1.5 degree target of the Paris agreement. To implement the target, Volt proposes a broad certificate trading scheme, the proceeds of which should be redistributed to citizens. Volt supports investment into nuclear power for maintenance and new reactors if safety standards are met. A European energy grid is promoted to integrate production and distribution in the European single market.  

As opposed to other movements promoting European integration, such as Pulse of Europe or the European Federalists, Volt has participated in elections on all levels of government as a political party. Its first major objective was the European Parliament elections in May 2019.. Volt has participated successfully in local, national, and European elections.

Co-Presidents of Volt Europa

National sections

Albania 

Volt Albania is not registered as a party in Albania, but engages as a movement on the ground and participates at the European level of Volt.

Austria 

Volt Österreich is Volt's registered political party in Austria. The party planned to take part in the European elections in 2019, but did not succeed in collecting the required 2,600 signatures in time to qualify for the ballot. Since then, the party contested some local elections, but did not receive a mandate.

Belgium 

Volt Belgium/Belgique/België/Belgien is Volt's registered political party in Belgium. Volt Belgium was the first section to participate in elections, when they took part in the 2018 Belgian local elections in Ixelles, Etterbeek and also shared a list with the local Pirate Party (Paars) for Antwerp. During the 2019 European Parliament elections, Volt participated in the Dutch Speaking electoral college, receiving 0.48% of the vote, not enough for a seat.

Bulgaria 

Волт България (Volt Bulgaria) is Volt's registered political party in Bulgaria. In the national parliamentary elections in November 2021, Volt achieved a mandate in the National Assembly for the first time as part of the electoral alliance We Continue the Change. In December 2021, Volt Bulgaria achieved a second mandate, when a Member of Parliament from their coalition became a minister and freed up an MP spot for Volt Bulgaria.

Cyprus 
In Cyprus, Volt cooperates with the movement New Wave - The Other Cyprus. The Cypriot movement and Volt signed a memorandum of understanding for a merger in November 2021. As a result, New Wave was renamed "New Wave || Volt Cyprus - The Other Cyprus". The plan is to merge to form the Volt Cyprus party after the 2023 presidential elections.

Czech Republic 
Volt was founded 2019 and operated from 11 April 2021 to 28 June 2022 in the Czech Republic as the registered association Volt Česká republika, z.s, with Karolina Machová and Adam Hanka as the chairs of the association and Jan Klátil as the treasurer. Volt is now registered as a political party, Volt Česko.

In the 2022 local elections in Prague, the party contested an election for the first time. Volt received 4 816 votes (0.14 %) and thus did not win a mandate.

Denmark 
The Danish chapter of Volt, Volt Danmark, was founded on 21 July 2018. The party contested an election for the first time in November 2021 with the municipal election in Frederiksberg, Volt received 105 votes (0.2 %) and thus did not win a mandate. To be eligible for national elections, to be held in 2023 at the latest, the party needs 21,000 digital signatures. To run in the European Elections in 2024, the party needs 71,000 digital signatures.

France 
Volt France was founded as the ninth national branch of Volt Europa, and has nine active branches, with "city teams" in Grenoble, Lille, Lyon, Nantes, Nice, Paris, Rennes, and two cross-border branches in Ain-Geneva and Strasbourg-Kehl.

The party was unable to participate in the European Elections 2019 due to a lack of funding. In 2020, Volt France participated in municipal elections. The party ran in coalition with the Greens in Lille, where they received 24.5% in the first round, and lost in the second round with 39.4%; as a coalition with "100% citoyens" in Lyon, receiving 3.4% and 1.6% in two districts; and alone in Paris' 9th district, receiving 0.5% in the first round.

In the 2022 general elections, the party contested in a number of constituencies, including overseas constituencies.

Germany 

Volt Germany (German Volt Deutschland) became a registered political party in Germany in 2018, allowing it to compete in German elections. Volt Deutschland's basic programme is based upon a policies proposal, which is also fundamental for Volt Europa. The German branch's initial focus was the five "challenges" of "an intelligent state, social equality, economic renaissance, politically active citizenship" and "global balance". It also seeks to implement an overarching policy of transnational EU reform in accordance with the programmes of both Volt Deutschland and Volt Europa. Volt Deutschland's programme for the 2019 European elections 2019 was identical to that of all other European sections. It was adopted as the "Amsterdam Declaration" by all Volt sections in October 2018.

In the 2019 European Election "Volt Deutschland" received 248,824 votes, 0.7% of the total votes in Germany. As a result, Volt Deutschland's leading candidate Damian Boeselager won one of Germany's 96 seats in the European Parliament.

Volt Deutschland has won individual seats on a number of city councils. In local elections occurring the same day as the European Elections in 2019, Volt received 1.2% of the votes for the election to the City Council in Mainz, winning 1 seat. In Bavaria's 2020 local elections, the party won one seat each in Bamberg and Munich. In Munich, Volt subsequently became part of the governing coalition with the Social Democrats. Later that year, the party won seats on the city councils of Cologne, Bonn, Aachen, Siegen, Münster, Düsseldorf, and Paderborn. Volt was particularly strong in Cologne and Bonn, where it received around 5% of the votes, resulting in four and three seats, respectively. In March 2021, the party also won seats in Darmstadt, Frankfurt, Wiesbaden, Fulda and Heusenstamm in the 2021 Hessian local elections. The 6.5% vote share in Darmstadt, to win five of the 71 seats, was the party's best ever result in a German council.

Greece 

Volt Greece (Greek Βολτ Ελλάδας) was founded in 2018. In July 2022, the group elected its first executive secretariat and an ethics committee, which were tasked with preparing its establishment as a party. On 4 October 2022, the party was officially registered, becoming the 18th registered party of Volt Europa. In December 2022, Volt founded the new political alliance Green & Purple (Greek: ΠΡΑΣΙΝΟ & ΜΩΒ) together with the parties Ikologi Prasini, Pirate Party of Greece, Greens – Solidarity, Greek Party for the Animals and the ecofeminist movement Kyklos.

On 12 and 13 March the party held its founding congress in Athens.

Ireland 
Volt Ireland (Volt Éire in Irish) formed in the run-up to the 2019 European elections, but did not initially register as a party, holding meetings in various cities. In October 2021, the group launched an attempt to register as a party. To do so, 300 signatures are required from Irish citizens and EU citizens living in Ireland.

Italy 

Volt Italy (Italian Volt Italia) was founded on 18 July 2018. Gianluca Guerra and Eliana Canavesio are party leaders and Pasquale Lisena is treasurer.

The party was unable to take part in the 2019 European elections, failing to obtain the required 150,000 notarised supporter signatures. Since then, the party has taken part in a number of regional and local elections, winning mandates in Mantua and Isernia, among other cities, where Federica Vinci, then chair of Volt Italia, was elected deputy mayor.

Luxembourg 

Volt Luxembourg was founded in 2019 and received around 2% of the vote in the 2019 European Parliamentary Elections.

Malta 

Volt Malta was officially registered as a political party in Malta in May 2021 and is contesting the 2022 elections for the national parliament, with two candidates covering four districts.

In early March, the party stated its support for the legalization of abortion. Kass Mallia was Malta's first transgender politician to run for election. Volt Malta presented a proposal for AirMalta to become a public limited company through an initial public offering, look for North American travel markets, and a Diaspora Pass to entice the Maltese diaspora to visit Malta.

The party received 382 votes (0.13%), receiving no seats in parliament.

Netherlands 

Volt Netherland is Volt's registered political party in the Netherlands and was founded on 23 June 2018 in Utrecht. The party received 2.42% of the vote in the 2021 general election, taking three seats in the Dutch House of Representatives. It has since then lost 1 seat due to the removal of Nilüfer Gündogan from the party due to reports of reckless and abusive behavior. Gündogan sued and had to be re-admitted into the parliamentary group temporarily, but was ejected again a week later after being dismissed as a member by Volt Europa. The Amsterdam Appelate Court ruled in February 2023, overturning the previous ruling that Volt was allowed to expell Gündoğan from the parliamentary group.

Portugal 

In October 2019, Volt Portugal submitted more than the 9,000 signatures needed to register as a political party. After multiple delays, the Constitutional Court approved Volt Portugal as the country's 25th party in June 2020. Volt Portugal initially planned to contest regional elections on the Azores in Autumn 2020, but was unable to do so due to a slow registration process, which did not allow enough time to recruit candidates.

In the September 2021 local elections, the party contested in Lisbon (0.58%), Porto (0.42%), Tomar (1.36%), Coimbra (coalition 43.92%) and Oeiras (coalition 7.57%), winning a mandate in Coimbra. Independent MEP Francisco Guerreiro supported the party in the local elections and announced he would join the party after his mandate expired.

In the January 2022 general election, Volt Portugal contested a national election for the first time, running in 18 of 20 districts. The party received 0.1% of the vote and did not win any seats.

Romania 
Volt România is Volt's registered political party in Romania. It was registered in February 2021, the 15th registered national party of Volt Europa. The group has been active in the country since 2017, participating in initiatives against attacks on the rule of law and mobilising the diaspora to participate in the elections.

Spain 

Volt Spain (Spanish: Volt España) was officially registered as a party in Spain on 15 June 2018 as the third national section. The party won 32,291 votes in the 2019 European Parliament election. In May, the party contested the local elections in Madrid for the first time since the European elections, but failed to win a mandate. During the elections, a representative of the right-wing populist Vox warned against confusion with his own party, as the placement of the ballot papers next to each other was, according to him, intended to cause confusion. Volt's average age in Spain is below 35, and its chairpersons are Rachele Arciulo and Cristian Castrillón.

Sweden 
Volt Sverige is Volt's registered political party in Sweden. Michael Holz and Alexander Löf are party leaders and Joel Boehme is treasurer. The party campaigned for the 2019 European Parliament elections, but as a write-in party without its own ballot papers, relying on voters to write the party's name on blank ballot papers. Volt Sverige received 146 votes in this way.

In early November 2021, the Ljusnarsberg branch of Liberalerna (The Liberals) announced its intention to become an association and run for Volt in the local elections. The party's local elected representative joined Volt, becoming the first and only Volt representative in Sweden.

The party participated in the 2022 Swedish general election and received 89 votes.

Switzerland 
Volt Switzerland was founded on 9 October 2019. There are teams in Geneva, Zurich, Basel, Bern and Lugano. In February 2020, Volt participated in the Unity Committee for the Free Movement of Persons. It is intended to address concerns of foreigners and Swiss with a migration background to achieve greater participation in Swiss public life and was also directed against the citizens' initiative "For moderate immigration (limitation initiative)".

In the municipal elections in Zurich in February 2022, Volt stood for the first time in an election in Switzerland and fielded candidates in 2 out of 9 constituencies. In constituency 7+8 the party achieved 0.24%, in constituency 10 0.34%, which means that it did not win a mandate.

The party is part of the Swiss Europe Initiative, which calls for the Parliament and the Federal Council to start negotiations with the EU on institutional issues and cooperation.

Ukraine 
Volt Ukraine was founded in July 2022. Its founder and chairman is Mykhaylo Pobigay, a war veteran and the head of the non-profit organisation Land of The Free. Volt Ukraine advocates for Ukraine to join the EU, as well as more military support and a European orientation for Ukraine. Members of Volt Ukraine also help support refugees and arrange accommodation in Europe.

United Kingdom 

Volt UK was registered with the British Electoral Commission in January 2020, and campaigns for the UK to rejoin the European Union.

European Parliament elections

2019 European Parliament election 

In France (unable to raise €800,000 in funding to meet legal requirement to print its own ballot papers), Italy (failed to collect 150,000 signatures), Austria (failed to collect 2,600 signatures), Portugal (failed to collect 7,500 signatures), and Denmark (failed to collect a number of voter declarations corresponding to at least 2% of all valid votes at the last general election), Volt had intended to participate in the European Parliament elections but was unable to meet local requirements in time.

National Parliament elections

Bulgaria

Germany

Malta

Netherlands

Portugal

Sweden

Funding 
According to the party's financial accounts, it generates most of its income through membership fees and donations. National chapters provide 25% of their membership fees to Volt Europa to finance its operation. Volt claims to publish every donation exceeding 3,000 Euro per donation or donor per year within 15 days from its receipt on the party's website and that its national and local chapters adhere to the same standard. 
On 9 May 2021, Volt announced that they had raised 40,000 Euros in three weeks in a fundraising drive to professionalize Volt in preparation for the 2024 European Parliament election. 

Volt has received several large donations from firms in the housing and start-up sectors. It's biggest donors are Marc Dreesmann, heir to Anton Dreesmann of Dutch clothing company Vroom & Dreesmann with around €160.000, and Christian Oldendorff, heir to German shipping firm Oldendorff Carriers with around €120.000. The NGO JoinPolitics has donated €50.000 to Volt Germany for a joint project ("Team Europa") to mobilize minority candidates for the European elections.

Awards

International cooperation 
From 14 to 19 July 2021, Volt Europa delegates travelled to Yerevan, Armenia, to meet with representatives of the European Party of Armenia.

In November 2021, the Cypriot movement New Wave – The Other Cyprus and Volt signed a memorandum of understanding for a merger.

Notes 
1.ISMV coalition won 13 seats in parliament in the July 2021 Bulgarian parliamentary election, none of which were allocated to members of Volt.
2.ISMV coalition won 14 seats in parliament in the April 2021 Bulgarian parliamentary election, none of which were allocated to members of Volt.
3.Renew Scotland contested in five regions and no constituencies in the 2021 Scottish Parliament election.

References

External links 
 
 
 Programme across Europe for the elections to the European Parliament

 
2017 establishments in Europe
Eurofederalism
International organizations based in Europe
Political movements in Europe
Pro-Europeanism
Pro-European political parties in the United Kingdom
Pan-European Pro-European political parties